Rinne Groff (aka Rinne Becker Groff) is an American playwright and performer.

Biography
Groff was trained at Yale University and New York University's Tisch School of the Arts, where she currently teaches.

A founding member of Elevator Repair Service Theater Company, she has been a part of the writing, staging, and performing of their shows since the company's inception in 1991. She is at work on a commission from The Guthrie Theater in Minneapolis.

With playwright/lyricist John Dempsey and composer Michael Friedman, Groff co-wrote the book and lyrics for the stage musical adaptation of the movie Saved!. Her play Compulsion opened Off-Broadway at The Public Theater on February 1, 2011, starring Mandy Patinkin and directed by Oskar Eustis. The play had previously played at Yale Repertory Theatre and   Berkeley Repertory Theatre, both in 2010.

Awards
Recipient of a 2006 Guggenheim Award
Recipient of a 2005 Whiting Award for drama
Finalist for the Susan Smith Blackburn Prize in 2002-03 for her play Orange Lemon Egg Canary
Fellowship from the MacDowell Colony in 2005.

Works
 Inky (Clubbed Thumb and Salt Theater, 2000)
The Five Hysterical Girls Theorem (Target Margin Theater, 2000)
 Jimmy Carter was a Democrat (produced at Clubbed Thumb and P.S. 122, 2002) 
 Orange Lemon Egg Canary (Actors Theater of Louisville, 2003)
 You Never Know (co-writer with Charles Strouse) (Trinity Rep, 2005)
 Molière Impromptu (Trinity Rep, 2005)
 The Ruby Sunrise (Public Theater, November 2005, directed by Oskar Eustis)
 What Then (Clubbed Thumb, 2006)
 Compulsion (2010, Yale Repertory Theatre, 2010)
 77% (San Francisco Playhouse, 2014)
 Fire in Dreamland (Public Theater, 2018)

References

External links
Profile and Production History at The Whiting Foundation
 Rinne Groff bio and play listing on Playscripts, Inc.

American dramatists and playwrights
Year of birth missing (living people)
Living people
Yale University alumni
Tisch School of the Arts alumni